Crystal Lynn Bowersox (born August 4, 1985) is an American singer, songwriter and actress who was the runner-up on the ninth season of American Idol. She was the first female finalist in three years.

Bowersox's debut album, Farmer's Daughter, was released on December 14, 2010 by Jive Records. Bowersox released her second album, All That for This, on March 26, 2013.

Early life
Bowersox and her twin brother, Karl,  were born in Elliston, Ohio to Kelly Lynn Bowersox (née Bowlander) and William Lester Bowersox. Her parents divorced when she was two years old. At age six, Bowersox was diagnosed with type 1 diabetes. She attended Oak Harbor High School in Oak Harbor, Ohio and later attended the Toledo School for the Arts in Toledo, Ohio. She was in choir and played flute in the school marching band. Bowersox performed her first professional gig at the age of 10. She appeared at local bars in Toledo, most popularly Papa's Tavern, and The Village Idiot in Maumee, Ohio.

At the age of seventeen, she moved to Chicago, where she played music as a busker at train stations, including the Washington and Lake Redline stops. She frequented open mics, such as the In One Ear show at the Heartland Cafe, and Uncommon Ground Clark and Grace, and Devon locations. She also played extensively in Chicago's Lakeview neighborhood. According to Bowersox, she lived in poverty at this time, and had to resort to begging for insulin at a pharmacy to manage her diabetes after her health insurance expired.

In 2006, the Chicago Department of Cultural Affairs chose Bowersox to represent Chicago folk musicians in the Sister Cities program "Experience Chicago", held in Birmingham. In 2007, Bowersox traveled internationally on an independent small cafe tour, including Memphis, Oaxaca City, Ankara and Istanbul. She gave birth to a son, Anthony Levi Mason, in 2009; according to Bowersox, his father left her six weeks into her pregnancy.

American Idol
Bowersox auditioned for American Idol in Chicago, Illinois. She sang "Piece of My Heart". Guest judge Shania Twain commented that she had a "raw, natural talent."

On March 2, 2010, Bowersox was hospitalized due to Diabetic ketoacidosis (DKA) from type 1 diabetes, forcing a last minute switch in scheduling to give her extra time to recuperate. Bowersox confirmed the illness on the May 19, 2010 results show during an interview with host Ryan Seacrest. The men competed that day instead of the women. She sang the next day and impressed all of the judges.

The following week, her strong performance prompted Simon Cowell to state, "Right now, you are the one everyone has to beat."

After Siobhan Magnus's elimination from the top 6 of American Idol, Bowersox became the last remaining female contestant in the competition.

Bowersox was the first female contestant to make it to the finale since Jordin Sparks won the title in 2007. She is also the first contestant in American Idol history to have one of their original songs played on the show, or at least during their hometown package. Crystal's original song "Holy Toledo" was played on the May 19 Top 3 Results show as the background music for her homecoming package - when she returned to Toledo, Ohio and Elliston, Ohio the previous weekend - and segued into her live performance of the same song at "Bowerstock".

During her time on Idol, Bowersox dated Tony Kusian, but the couple broke up just hours before the Idol finale.

On the final performance day, in Simon Cowell's final critique on American Idol, he called her performance of "Up to the Mountain" "outstanding" and "by far, the best performance and song of the night".

On May 26, 2010, Bowersox was named runner-up to winner Lee DeWyze. She announced that after her Idol career, she wants to bring more awareness to type 1 diabetes.

Bowersox is the third Idol Runner-Up (preceded by Clay Aiken and David Archuleta) to never be in the Bottom 3 or Bottom 2.

Performances

  Due to the judges using their one 'save' for Michael Lynche, the Top 9 remained intact for another week.
  Though Crystal Bowersox was the last contestant announced to be 'safe' and moving on to the Top 3, Ryan Seacrest stressed on the Top 4 Results Night that 'safe' contestants would be announced "in no particular order." Thus, the audience has no way of knowing which of the Top 3 was the second-lowest vote-getter that night after Michael Lynche, who was eliminated.
  Song selected by Ellen DeGeneres.

Post-Idol career
On May 27, 2010, one day after Bowersox's second place Idol finish, it was announced that she had signed with 19 Entertainment/Jive Records. Her single "Up to the Mountain" has since been released to radio stations and iTunes.

2010–12: Farmer's Daughter
Bowersox's debut album, Farmer's Daughter, was released to stores and iTunes on December 14, 2010.  Bowersox performed her single "Farmer's Daughter" on The Ellen DeGeneres Show on December 16, 2010.

On October 7, 2011, RCA Music Group announced it was disbanding Jive Records along with Arista Records and J Records. With the shutdown, all other artists previously signed to these three labels would see their future material released under the RCA Records brand. However, Bowersox was not one of the artists who made the move, and was instead left without a record label.

She made her acting debut on a second-season episode of Body of Proof.

An EP of pre-Idol recordings was called Once Upon a Time... was self-released in June 2012.

She was a guest on the Blues Traveler album, Suzie Cracks the Whip, performing vocals with John Popper on the song "I Don't Wanna Go", and appeared with them in concert at their concert of July 4, 2012 at Red Rocks Amphitheatre in Colorado.

2012–present: All That for This

In October 2012, Bowersox signed a recording deal with Shanachie Records.

On January 7, 2013, it was confirmed that Bowersox's second studio album, All That for This, would be released March 26, 2013. The album was produced by Steve Berlin of Los Lobos and features Jakob Dylan. Bowersox debuted the first single from the album, "Dead Weight", on On Air with Ryan Seacrest on February 5, 2013. Bowersox told Seacrest, "This song means more to me than even I can completely comprehend."

Bowersox began a headlining tour in support of the album on March 1, 2013. The band Montë Mar was her concert opener, as well as her backing band on dates through March 31, 2013. On March 25, 2013, Bowersox appeared on The Tonight Show with Jay Leno and performed her song "Movin' On" to promote the album. It was announced here that Bowersox will play Patsy Cline in the Broadway production of Always, Patsy Cline. It was announced on June 11, 2013 that Bowersox would be headlining the Lancaster Festival in Lancaster, Ohio on June 27, 2013

Personal life
Bowersox and musician Brian Walker were married on October 10, 2010, at Uncommon Ground Café in Chicago, the restaurant where the couple had met six years earlier while both were performing at Open Mic Night. It was announced on May 6, 2013, that they were ending their marriage.

While appearing on Good Day L.A. to promote her Christmas album on November 26, 2013, Bowersox came out as bisexual. "I have been bisexual as long as I can remember," she said.  Bowersox then performed her song "Coming Out For Christmas" which explores the subject matter.

Discography

Studio albums

Digital albums

Extended plays

Singles

Digital singles

Music videos

Filmography

Awards and nominations

References

External links
 Official website
 
 Crystal Bowersox  at American Idol

American multi-instrumentalists
1985 births
Living people
American acoustic guitarists
American blues singers
American country guitarists
American women country singers
American country singer-songwriters
American women pop singers
American women singer-songwriters
American folk guitarists
American folk singers
American harmonica players
American pop guitarists
Bisexual actresses
Bisexual singers
Bisexual songwriters
LGBT people from Ohio
American LGBT singers
American LGBT songwriters
American street performers
American Idol participants
Jive Records artists
RCA Records artists
19 Recordings artists
People with type 1 diabetes
People from Ottawa County, Ohio
Actresses from Ohio
Guitarists from Ohio
Singer-songwriters from Ohio
21st-century American actresses
21st-century American women guitarists
21st-century American guitarists
21st-century American women singers
Country musicians from Ohio
20th-century American LGBT people
21st-century American LGBT people
American bisexual writers